WKJR (1460 AM, "Radio Variedades") is a radio station broadcasting a Spanish Variety music format. It is licensed to serve Rantoul, Illinois, and broadcasts to the Champaign, Illinois, area. The station, established in 1963, is currently owned by Ruben's Productions, Inc.

The station was assigned the WKJR call sign by the Federal Communications Commission on September 29, 2006.

WKJR was the former call sign of a now-defunct radio station at 1520 AM in Muskegon Heights, Michigan.

References

External links

KJR
KJR
Radio stations established in 1963
Rantoul, Illinois
1963 establishments in Illinois
Champaign County, Illinois